Palpara is a neighbourhood in Chakdaha in Kalyani subdivision of the Nadia district in the state of West Bengal, India. The Palpara railway station is 59 km from Sealdah station. Palpara is famous for its 17th-century Terracotta Kali temple which is now comes under the supervision of Archaeological Survey of India (ASI).

Geography

Location

Note: The map alongside presents some of the notable locations in the subdivision. All places marked in the map are linked in the larger full screen map. All the four subdivisions are presented with maps on the same scale – the size of the maps vary as per the area of the subdivision.

Education 
There are two high schools at Palpara. One Secondary School, Palpara Vidyamandir and one H.S School, Bhawanipur Sukanta Vidyaniketan. There is a Law college near Palpara named J.R.S.E.T. College of Law.

Culture 
Durgapuja, Kali puja, Saraswati puja are widely celebrated. The Muslims celebrate Eid in Palpara.

David J. McCutchion mentions the Palpara temple (26’ x 21’) as possibly a 17th-century structure. The A.S.I. has brought the roof to a point.

Palpara temple gallery

References

External links 

Cities and towns in Nadia district